August Carl  Eduard Baldamus (April 18, 1812 in Giersleben, Saxony-Anhalt – October 30, 1893 in Coburg) was a German ornithologist.

August Baldamus studied theology at the University of Berlin. In 1859 he became professor at the Gymnasium in Köthen where he met Carl Andreas Naumann and his brother Johann Friedrich Naumann both ornithologists.
In 1849 he became Pastor in Diebzig, in 1859 moving to the same office in Osternienburg. He retired to Coburg in 1870.
Baldamus was the founder of the Deutsche Ornithologen-Gesellschaft (German Ornithologists' Society) and published the ornithological journal Naumannia between 1849 and 1858.

Works

Johann Andreas Naumann u. Johann Friedrich Naumann: Naturgeschichte der Vögel Deutschlands. Nach eigenen Erfahrungen entworfen. Fleischer, Leipzig 1822–1866, Band 1–13 Naturgeschichte der Vogel Deutschlands continuation finished in 1860 by August Carl  Eduard Baldamus and Wilhelm Blasius.
 Vogel-Märchen. Dresden, Schöufelb, 1876.
Die Federviehzucht vom wirthschaftlichen Standpunkte. Hühner, Enten, Gänse.Dresden, G. Schönfeld 1876–78
Das Leben der europäischen Kuckucke : nebst Beiträgen zur Lebenskunde der übrigen parasitischen Kuckucke und Stärlinge Berlin :Verlag von Paul Parey,1892.

External links
BDHL Digital version of Das Leben der europäischen Kuckucke : nebst Beiträgen zur Lebenskunde der übrigen parasitischen Kuckucke und Stärlinge
BDHL Naumannia : Archiv für die Ornithologie Vorzugsweise Europa's : Organ der Deutsche Ornithologen-Gesellschaft.

1812 births
1893 deaths
People from Salzlandkreis
German ornithologists